The 2020 K League 1 was the 38th season of the top division of professional football in South Korea since its establishment in 1983 as K League, and the third season under its current name, the K League 1. Jeonbuk Hyundai Motors were the defending champions. They successfully defended their title and won a record-breaking eight K League championship.

The regular season was scheduled to begin on 29 February and to end on 4 October, but was postponed due to the COVID-19 pandemic. The K League 1 season officially began on 8 May. On 24 April 2020, the Korean Professional Football Union (K League) confirmed that they would adopt a modified plan for the season, changing the regular season to 22 matches, and 5 Final Round matches per team. Sangju Sangmu and the lowest-placed team at the end of the season were relegated to the K League 2 for the 2021 season.

Commencing this season, an additional spot for foreign players has been added for players from member countries of the ASEAN Football Federation.

Promotion and relegation
Teams relegated to the 2020 K League 2
 Gyeongnam FC
 Jeju United

Teams promoted from the 2019 K League 2
 Gwangju FC
 Busan IPark

Participating clubs by province
The following twelve clubs will compete in the K League 1 during the 2020 season.

Stadiums

Foreign players
Restricting the number of foreign players strictly to five per team, including a slot for a player from the Asian Football Confederation countries and a slot for a player from the Association of Southeast Asian Nations. A team could use five foreign players on the field each game, including at least one player from the AFC confederation.
The name in bold indicates that the player was registered during the mid-season transfer window.

League table

Positions by matchday

Round 1–22

Round 23–27

Final rounds were from round 23 to round 27

Fixtures and results

Matches 1–22 
Teams play each other twice, once at home, once away.

Final Round Matches 23–27 
Teams only play each other once.
 

Final A

Final B

Season statistics

Top scorers

Top assists

Awards

Most Valuable Player of The Round

Monthly Awards

Season Awards 

The 2020 K League Awards was held on 5 November 2020.

K League Most Valuable Player

The K League Most Valuable Player award was won by  Son Jun-ho (Jeonbuk Hyundai Motors).

K League Young Player

The K League Young Player award was won by  Song Min-kyu (Pohang Steelers).

K League Top Scorer

The K League Top Scorer award was won by  Júnior Negrão (Ulsan Hyundai).

K League Top Assistor

The K League Top Assistor award was won by  Kang Sang-woo (Sangju Sangmu / Pohang Steelers).

K League Best XI

K League Manager of the Year
The K League Manager of the Year award was won by  Kim Gi-dong (Pohang Steelers).

See also
 2020 K League 2

References

K League 1 seasons
South Korea
2020 in South Korean football
K League